Viștea may refer to several places in Romania:

Viștea, a commune in Brașov County, or its villages Viștea de Jos and Viștea de Sus
Viștea, a village in Gârbău Commune, Cluj County
Viștea Mare, a peak in the Făgăraș Mountains, Brașov County
Viștea (river), a tributary of the Olt in Brașov County